Sara Ramirez (born 1975) is a Mexican-American singer, songwriter, and actor.

Sara Ramírez may also refer to:

 Sara Ramirez (EP), their 2011 debut extended play
 Sara Estela Ramírez (1881–1910), Mexican teacher, writer and activist
 Sara Ramírez (table tennis) (born 1987), Spanish table tennis player

Ramirez, Sara